The Kloster Mariensee (i.e. Mariensee Convent) is an Evangelical Lutheran women's convent in Mariensee, a district of Neustadt am Rübenberge close to Hanover. It is one of five Calenberg Convents, which are administered by the Klosterkammer Hannover.

History 
The Kloster Mariensee was founded in 1207 as a Cistercian women's monastery by Bernard II, Count of Wölpe and endowed with a vast landownership.

Furnishings 
Tapestry „Das Jüngste Gericht“ (The Judgment Day)

Literature 
 Ernst Andreas Friedrich: Wenn Steine reden könnten. Band IV. Landbuch-Verlag, Hannover 1998, 
 Bärbel Görcke: Kloster Mariensee. In: Evangelische Klöster in Niedersachsen. Rostock 2008, 
 Wilhelm von Hodenberg (Hrsg.): Archiv des Klosters Mariensee (= Calenberger Urkundenbuch; 5. Abtheilung). Jänecke, Hannover 1858 (uni-goettingen.de)

References

External links 

 Kloster Mariensee
 Sticken im Kloster – Wie der Klosterstich wieder nach Mariensee kam
 Kloster Mariensee liegt an einem Nebenweg des Pilgerweges Loccum-Volkenroda

1206 establishments in Europe
1200s establishments in Germany
Christian monasteries established in the 13th century
Buildings and structures in Hanover Region
Monasteries in Lower Saxony
Cistercian nunneries in Germany
Lutheran women's convents
Convents in Germany